Brandon Plantation is a historic plantation home located near Alton, Halifax County, Virginia. The main house is a two-part, frame vernacular farmhouse. The earliest section of the farmhouse is a single-pile, three-bay, gable-roof dwelling erected about 1800. Attached to the east end is a two-bay section added about 1842. The interior features details attributed to Thomas Day, a well-known African-American cabinetmaker from Milton, North Carolina. The farmhouse underwent an extensive remodeling and modernization in the early 1960s but preserves a significant degree of architectural integrity. Also on the property are a contributing frame kitchen / slave quarter outbuilding, an early stone-lined well, and the sites of early agricultural outbuildings.

It was listed on the National Register of Historic Places in 1996.

References

Houses on the National Register of Historic Places in Virginia
Greek Revival houses in Virginia
Federal architecture in Virginia
Houses completed in 1842
National Register of Historic Places in Halifax County, Virginia
Houses in Halifax County, Virginia